Nour Mahmoud Rajab Zoqash (born 1 September 1999), known as Nour Zoqash, is a Jordanian footballer who plays as a defender for local Women's League club Shabab Al-Ordon and the Jordan women's national team.

References

External links

1999 births
Living people
Jordanian women's footballers
Jordan women's international footballers
Women's association football defenders
Sportspeople from Amman
Jordan Women's Football League players